In Greek mythology, Stheno ( or ; Greek: Σθενώ, 'forceful') was the eldest of the Gorgons, vicious female monsters with brass hands, sharp fangs and "hair" made of living venomous snakes.

Mythology
The daughter of Phorcys and Ceto, Stheno was born in the caverns beneath Mount Olympus. She and her sister Euryale were both immortal, but the third sister, Medusa, was not.

Of the three Gorgons, she was known to be the most independent and ferocious, having killed more men than both of her sisters combined. In Roman mythology, she was transformed into a Gorgon for her relationship to her sister Medusa, who was raped by the sea god Neptune in Minerva's temple. Furious with Medusa for this act of desecration, Minerva changed her into a terrible monster, along with her sisters Stheno and Euryale. Stheno tends to be depicted as a thin gorgon monster with red snakes curling around her head instead of hair. Earlier accounts, however, describe her as having a scaly head, a boar's tusks, bronzed hands, a protruding tongue, glaring eyes and a snake around the waist as a belt.

When the Gorgon Medusa was beheaded by Perseus, Stheno and Euryale tried to kill him, but failed due to his use of Hades' cap, which made him invisible.

See also
Cultural depictions of Medusa and Gorgons

Notes

Gorgons
Female legendary creatures
Greek legendary creatures
Mythological monsters
Women in Greek mythology